The Interpretation Act 1850 (13 & 14 Vict. c. 21) was an Act of the Parliament of the United Kingdom passed in 1850 that simplified the language that was used in statutes. It was also known as Lord Brougham's Act, and its long title was An Act for shortening the Language used in Acts of Parliament.

The Act devised the current system of dividing legislation into sections which are automatically substantive enactments, and also made various other provisions for interpreting other statutes. For example, it stated that the masculine includes the feminine (thus enabling "he" to be written instead of "he or she"), unless expressly indicated otherwise.

It has also been extended in its application to former colonies such as New Zealand.

It has since been superseded by other Interpretation Acts, including the Interpretation Act 1978.

References 

1850 in British law
United Kingdom Acts of Parliament 1850